Whitford is a village near Axminster in East Devon.

The West of England Main Line runs through a cutting close to the village, which is four miles north of the Jurassic Coast at Seaton.

The village has a church, St Mary at the Cross, a village hall, and some attractive thatched cottages and is within the East Devon AONB.

External links

History of Whitford in Devon at http://www.visionofbritain.org.uk/place/21221

Villages in Devon